Roseveltpiek is a mountain in Suriname at . It is located in the Sipaliwini District. The mountain is named after Johan Cateau van Rosevelt. The Rosevelpiek as well as the Tebutop, the Magneetrots, and the Kasikasima were first mapped in 1904 during the Tapanahony expedition.

References

Inselbergs of South America
Mountains of Suriname
Sipaliwini District